Jan Mommaert was the name of two 17th-century printers in Brussels, father (active 1585–1627) and son (active 1646–1669). Between the dates of their activity, Martine van Straeten operated a printing house under the name Widow of Jan Mommaert.

Jan (I) Mommaert
The elder Mommaert began his printing business in Brussels in 1585, his first known publication being the terms of the city's surrender to Alexander Farnese, Duke of Parma: .

In 1594 he printed a brief but richly illustrated account of the festive reception in Brussels of the new governor general, Archduke Ernest of Austria:  (available on Google Books).

His shop was called simply De Druckerye ("The printing shop") and stood in the Stoofstraat behind Brussels Town Hall. Much of his printing was of the decrees of the city council.

His printing mark was a hooded falcon with the motto  (After darkness I hope for light).

Widow of Jan Mommaert
After Jan Mommaert the elder's death, probably in 1627, Martine van Straeten continued the family business under the name "Widow of Jan Mommaert". In 1631 she was in trouble with the authorities for publishing papal bulls without government permission, but she was pardoned on 16 September 1631.

In 1635 she printed the news pamphlet Nieuwe tydinghen uyt verscheyden quartieren van Europa, ghekomen tot Brussel tzedert den 18. tot den 23. Julii 1635 (New tidings from various parts of Europe, come to Brussels since the 18 to 23 July 1635), which might be an issue of an otherwise lost newspaper.

Jan (II) Mommaert
The younger Jan Mommaert (1611–1669) was not only a printer but also a poet. He produced a much reprinted compilation of amorous, pastoral and burlesque lyrics, some of them his own work, under the title Het Brabands nachtegaelken (first edition 1650). His other poetic works are Stichtelyck ende vermakelyck proces (1658) and Den Christelycken dagh (1658).

He served terms on the city council in 1654, 1660 and 1666.

Publications

Jan (I) Mommaert
 1585: Articulen ende conditien vanden tractate aengegaen ende ghesloten tusschen die Prince van Parma ende de stadt van Bruessele
 1594: Descriptio et explicatio pegmatum, arcuum et spectaculorum, quae Bruxellae Brabantiae pridie calendas februarii anno MDXCIIII exhibita fuere, sub ingressum serenissimi principis Ernesti, Dei gratia archiducis Austriae Available on Google Books
 1594: Maximilien de Vignacourt, Serenissimi Ernesti adventum gratulatur Belgicae Maxaemyliani V
 1596: Relation de ce que s'est exhibé en la ville de Bruxelles à l'entree du serenissime prince Albert, archiduc d'Austrice
 1597: Jean Scohier, L'estat et comportement des armes
 1599: Philip Numan, Panegyricus in adventum Alberti et Isabellae in civitate Bruxellensem
 1600: Mateo Alemán, Primera parte de la vida del picaro Guzman de Alfarache
 1600: States of Brabant, Instructie ghemaeckt by mijne heeren Staeten van Brabandt, achtervolghende der welcker men tellen sal allen de heerden van allen de schouwen
 1614: Andres de Soto, Het leven van den heyligen Joseph, bruydegom onser Liever Vrouwen, translated by Franciscus Vanden Broecke

Widow of Jan Mommaert
 1629: Jean Scohier, L'estat et comportement des armes (with a commendatory sonnet by Jan Mommaert the younger)
 1630: Juste Damant, Manière universelle de fortifier
 1635: Nieuwe tydinghen uyt verscheyden quartieren van Europa, ghekomen tot Brussel tzedert den 18. tot den 23. Julii 1635. Available on Google Books.
 1636: Eberhard Wassenberg, Scherp sinnighe Neep-Dichten (with a commendatory verse by Jan Mommaert the younger)

Jan (II) Mommaert
 1646: Erycius Puteanus, Bruxella septenaria
 1647: Pedro Calderón de la Barca, Het leven is maer droom (a Dutch translation of Life Is a Dream)
 1650: Jan Mommaert, Het Brabands nachtegaelken
 1656: Emmanuel d'Aranda, Relation de la captivité et liberté du sieur Emmanuel d'Aranda, mené esclave à Alger en 1640, et mis en liberté en 1642
 1660: César Oudin, Tesoro de las dos lenguas, española y francesa (corrected edition)

References

Businesspeople from Brussels
Book publishers (people) of the Spanish Netherlands